American Boy: A Profile of Steven Prince is a 1978 documentary directed by Martin Scorsese. Its subject is Scorsese's friend Steven Prince, known for his small role as Easy Andy, the gun salesman in Taxi Driver. Prince is a raconteur who tells stories about various events in his life.

The Neil Young song "Time Fades Away" is featured in the film.

A sequel, American Prince, was released in 2009 and was directed by Tommy Pallotta.

Synopsis
Martin Scorsese and a small group of friends gather in a living room in Los Angeles with the charismatic Steven Prince. Over the course of the evening, Scorsese films Prince talking about various events in his life with a mixture of humor and gravitas. Prince recalls stories such as being a former drug addict, a road manager for Neil Diamond, and a traumatic event in which he witnessed a boy die by accidental electrocution. Scorsese intersperses home movies of Prince as a child as he talks about his family.

When talking of his years as a heroin addict, he recalls Neil Diamond offering to help Prince get clean, but he refused. Later, however, Prince goes through recovery and remembers being shocked to learn he had a green ceiling in his home. He never noticed before because his eyelids had always been half-closed as an effect of the heroin.

Prince recalls injecting adrenaline into the heart of a woman who overdosed, with the help of a medical dictionary and a Magic Marker. This story was re-enacted by Quentin Tarantino in his screenplay for Pulp Fiction.

Prince also tells a story about his days working at a gas station, and having to shoot a man he caught stealing tires, after the man pulled out a knife and tried to attack him. This story was retold in the Richard Linklater film Waking Life.

Cast
 Steven Prince as self
 Julia Cameron as self (uncredited)
 Mardik Martin as self (uncredited)
 Kathi McGinnis as self (uncredited)
 George Memmoli as self (uncredited)
 Martin Scorsese as self (uncredited)

References

External links
 
 

Films directed by Martin Scorsese
Biographical documentary films
1978 films
American documentary films
1978 documentary films
1970s English-language films
1970s American films